Runcu is a commune in Gorj County, Oltenia, Romania. It is situated on the foot of Vâlcan Mountains, 17 km West of Târgu Jiu. The commune is composed of seven villages: Bâlta, Bâltișoara, Dobrița, Răchiți, Runcu, Suseni and Valea Mare. 

The name Runcu derives from medio-Latin "runcari" which means to deforest. A village on the Jaleș river named Dăbăcești (now disappeared) mentioned in a document of Dan I dated 3 Octombrie 1385 was the precursor of Runcu.  Runcu village was first mentioned in a document issued in 1486 by Vlad Călugărul. The dominant class of Wallachia maintained interests in the area during most of the Middle Ages. According to some sources, the local church was founded in the early 17th century by Domnița Florica, daughter of Michael the Brave, who sought refuge in Runcu after the death of her father.  

Stone and Bronze Age archaeological finds, as well as artifacts from before the Roman conquest, indicate that Runcu and the surrounding areas were inhabited much earlier.

Runcu is the birthplace of folk music singers Ioana Zlătaru and Maria Apostol (1954-1993). 

Scenes from the Romanian films Bătălia din umbră (1986), Iancu Jianu, haiducul (1981), Iancu Jianu, zapciul (1980) and Ecaterina Teodoroiu (1979) were shot in Runcu village and on the nearby Sohodol Gorge.

Photo gallery

Photo gallery - Sohodol River Gorge

References

External links
 Runcu and Sohodol Valley on Panoramio
 Runcu and Sohodol Valley - photos and text in German
 Map of the Vâlcan Mountain showing Runcu commune

Communes in Gorj County
Localities in Oltenia